Mysłów  is a village in the administrative district of Gmina Koziegłowy, within Myszków County, Silesian Voivodeship, in southern Poland.

History
Mysłów's history dates back to the Middle Ages.

During the invasion of Poland, which started World War II, on September 3, 1939, 22 Polish residents of Mysłów, including 10 children, were burned alive by the Germans (see Nazi crimes against the Polish nation).

References

Villages in Myszków County
Massacres of Poles
Nazi war crimes in Poland